The New York Collegiate Hockey Association was an intercollegiate athletic conference affiliated with the NCAA's Second Division. The league was created in 1977 between 6 then-existing SUNYAC schools as well as Buffalo and Elmira.

History
With the NCAA instituting a Division II Championship beginning with the 1977–78 season 8 upstate New York schools formed the NYCHA to have a better chance at securing one of the bids. So as to not lose those member schools, ECAC 2 began holding two separate conference tournaments the same year, (East and West), allowing those 6 teams to compete with other established division II schools for an NCAA bid. Plattsburgh State left the conference in 1981 and was replaced by RIT. The Conference added Canisius and Hobart over each of the succeeding two seasons but by 1986 the effort to keep the conference as a separate entity stopped and the NYCHA was dissolved.

For the duration of the conference all teams played one another twice during the season in conference games.

Member schools

# enrollment in 2018† as of 2018

Membership timeline

See also
ECAC 2

References

External links

NCAA Division II conferences